The 1872 United States presidential election in Arkansas took place on November 5, 1872, as part of the 1872 United States presidential election. Voters chose six representatives, or electors to the Electoral College, who voted for president and vice president.

Arkansas voted for the Republican candidate, Ulysses S. Grant, over Liberal Republican candidate Horace Greeley. Grant won Arkansas by a margin of 4.34%. However, due to the turbulent conditions of Reconstruction, along with various irregularities and allegations of electoral fraud, Congress rejected Arkansas's six electoral votes. Neighboring Louisiana's electoral votes were also rejected. This was the last time Arkansas voted Republican until 1972, one hundred years later.

Results

See also
 United States presidential elections in Arkansas

References

Arkansas
1872
1872 Arkansas elections